Songs I Heard (2001) is an album by Harry Connick Jr. covering songs from movies he watched as a child. The album features songs from Annie, The Sound of Music, Willy Wonka & the Chocolate Factory, Mary Poppins, and The Wizard of Oz. The album is arranged, orchestrated and conducted by Harry Connick Jr.

Winner of the 2002 Grammy Award for Best Traditional Pop Vocal Album, Songs I Heard was released on the same date as his album 30.

Background
Harry Connick, Jr. transforms songs from classic childhood films into big band songs. He called the album "a fun record, but it's definitely for adults."

In a 2003 interview, Connick compared getting children to appreciate music with getting them to appreciate broccoli. "If you give a kid fast food every day, that's all they'll be open to," said Connick. "If you give them broccoli, they may not like it, but they'll know it is out there and be open to it. You have to expose kids to music – jazz, classical music, rock and roll – and they'll be open."

Track listing

Musicians
Harry Connick, Jr. – vocals, piano

Awards
2001 Grammy Award winner – Best Traditional Pop Vocal Album
Harry Connick Jr. (artist)
Gregg Rubin (engineer)
Tracey Freeman (producer)

Charts

References

External links
 Media Samples at yourmusic.com

2001 albums
Harry Connick Jr. albums
Grammy Award for Best Traditional Pop Vocal Album
Columbia Records albums